Rodreck Mutuma (born 5 April 1988) is a Zimbabwean footballer currently playing with Saint-Éloi Lupopo in the Linafoot. He also plays for the Zimbabwe national team.

Rodi, born in Mvuma. At Athens mine compound where he grew up. Early education at Njerere primary school and Leopold Takawira high school.

Club 
Mutuma started his career with Zimbabwe Premier Soccer League side Dynamos in 2011. He stayed with Dynamos until 2013, when he joined South African Premier Soccer League club Bloemfontein Celtic. He made 14 appearances and scored two goals over two seasons for Bloem Celtic. In April 2014, it was claimed that Mutuma had rejoined former club Dynamos on a one-year contract after Bloem Celtic ended his contract. However, it was revealed in May that the South African club hadn't officially released him and therefore he couldn't be signed as a free agent for Dynamos.

Mutuma had a trial with Moroka Swallows in June but failed to win a contract. He subsequently rejoined Dynamos in Zimbabwe after his situation with Bloem Celtic was cleared by FIFA. He remained with Dynamos until 31 December 2014 when he left following the expiration of his contract. Two months later, Mutuma agreed to join CAPS United on a two-year contract. However, in May 2015 Mutuma was again on the move as he quit CAPS United, citing unpaid wages and bonuses. He then joined Dynamos for the third time in his career on 11 July.

International 
Mutuma has received 7 caps for the Zimbabwe national team. His debut came in 2013 in a 2014 FIFA World Cup qualifier against Egypt, and he has gone on to make six more appearances for Zimbabwe. He scored his first and second international goal in a 2016 African Nations Championship qualifier first leg against Lesotho on 18 October 2015. In the second leg, seven days later, Mutuma scored his third international goal.

Career statistics

International
.

International goals
. Scores and results list Zimbabwe's goal tally first.

Honours

Club
Dynamos
 Zimbabwe Premier Soccer League (3): 2011, 2012, 2014,

References

External links
Rodreck Mutuma at Footballdatabase

1988 births
Living people
Zimbabwean footballers
Zimbabwe international footballers
Dynamos F.C. players
Bloemfontein Celtic F.C. players
CAPS United players
Highlanders F.C. players
Yadah Stars F.C. players
FC Saint-Éloi Lupopo players
Zimbabwe Premier Soccer League players
South African Premier Division players
Linafoot players
Zimbabwean expatriate footballers
Expatriate soccer players in South Africa
Zimbabwean expatriate sportspeople in South Africa
Expatriate footballers in the Democratic Republic of the Congo
Zimbabwean expatriate sportspeople in the Democratic Republic of the Congo
Association football forwards
Zimbabwe A' international footballers
2016 African Nations Championship players